Thomas Church may refer to:

 Thomas Church (priest) (1707–1756), English cleric and controversialist
 Thomas Church (landscape architect) (1902–1978), American landscape architect and garden designer
 Thomas Haden Church (born 1960), American actor
 Thomas Langton Church (1870–1950), Mayor of Toronto and Canadian Member of Parliament  
 Thomas Church (colonial administrator) (1798–1860), British colonial administrator
 Thomas Church (MP), 16th-century member of the Parliament of England for Hereford

See also
St. Thomas Church (disambiguation)